Etobicoke—Lakeshore  is a provincial electoral district in Toronto, Ontario, Canada. It elects one member to the Legislative Assembly of Ontario.

It was created in 1987 from Lakeshore.

From 1987 to 1999 the district included all of Etobicoke south of a line following the CP Railway to Kipling Avenue to Bloor Street.

In 1999 the border was moved up to a line following Dundas Street to the 427 to Burnhamthorpe Road to Kipling Avenue to Mimico Creek to the Canadian Pacific Railway to Dundas Street.

In 2007, the borders were not altered.

Members of Provincial Parliament

Election results

Police detective Steve Ryan had originally been nominated by the Progressive Conservatives, however, according to party leader Tim Hudak, Ryan was unable to run in the by-election due to injuries sustained in a work related automobile accident; city councillor Doug Holyday was recruited to be the party's candidate instead.

2007 electoral reform referendum

References

External links
Elections Ontario Past Election Results
Map of riding for 2018 election

Etobicoke
Ontario provincial electoral districts
Provincial electoral districts of Toronto